Neder is a variant of Nader, a German occupational surname for a tailor. Notable people with this name include:
Adam Neder (1865–1910), Bavarian emigrant to the United States
Carlos Neder (1953–2021), Brazilian politician and physician
José Emilio Neder (born 1954), Argentine politician
Patricia Neder (born 1966), American former handball player

References

German-language surnames
Occupational surnames
Surnames of Brazilian origin
Surnames of Argentine origin